Archeological Site No. 121-52a is a historic site in the Ambajejus Camps of Maine containing prehistoric Native American artifacts from the Paleoindian, Late Paleoindian, and Middle Archaic/ Laurentian Tradition, Susquehanna Tradition, and Ceramic Periods. The area was written about by Henry David Thoreau. The site was added to the National Register of Historic Places on October 31, 1995.

References

		
National Register of Historic Places in Piscataquis County, Maine